Roman Michałowski may refer to:

Roman Michałowski (historian) (born 1949), a Polish historian
Roman Michałowski (painter) (born 1953), a Polish painter